Jaan Teemant  (in Illuste (now Paatsalu), Vigala Parish, Kreis Wiek (in present-day Pärnu County) – 1941? (date unknown)) was an Estonian lawyer and politician.

Background
Teemant studied in H. Treffner's Private High School. In 1901 he graduated from the Department of Law the Saint Petersburg University. He was a solicitor in Tallinn. In 1904–1905 was a member of the Tallinn Municipal Council. Teemant participated in the revolution of 1905, escaped to Switzerland in the same year and was sentenced to death in absentia. In 1908, he came back to Estonia after the end of the state of war, was in pretrial imprisonment in 1908–1909 and was sentenced to prison for one and a half years. He served the jail sentence in Saint Petersburg, and then spent 1911–1913 in penal exile in the Arkhangelsk province in northern Russia. 

After returning to Estonia, Teemant was elected member of the Estonian Provincial Assembly from 1917 to 1919. In 1918 he was Attorney General of the Republic of Estonia. During 1919–1920 he was a member of the Estonian Constituent Assembly (Asutav Kogu) and during 1923 – 1934–1937 he was a member of Estonian parliament (II-V Riigikogu). In 1939–1940, Teemant was the Estonian trustee in the German Trustee Government (an organisation for managing of the property of the resettled Baltic Germans in 1939–1940). On 23 July 1940, Teemant was arrested by the NKVD, and was probably shot in Tallinn or died in the Tallinn Central prison. According to other data he was sentenced to prison camp for 10 years on 21 October 1941, with no further information on his fate.

See also
List of people who disappeared

Awards
 1926 – Order of the Three Stars I (Latvia)
 1930 – Order of the Cross of the Eagle I

References

 Jaan teemant
 Ülo Kaevats et al. 2000. Eesti Entsüklopeedia 14. Tallinn: Eesti Entsüklopeediakirjastus, 

1872 births
Year of death unknown
People from Lääneranna Parish
People from Kreis Wiek
Farmers' Assemblies politicians
Heads of State of Estonia
Members of the Estonian Provincial Assembly
Members of the Estonian Constituent Assembly
Members of the Riigikogu, 1923–1926
Members of the Riigikogu, 1926–1929
Members of the Riigikogu, 1929–1932
Members of the Riigikogu, 1932–1934
Hugo Treffner Gymnasium alumni
Recipients of the Military Order of the Cross of the Eagle, Class I
Enforced disappearances in the Soviet Union
Estonian people who died in Soviet detention
Prisoners who died in Soviet detention